RSUA may refer to:
 Royal Society of Ulster Architects
 16S rRNA pseudouridine516 synthase, an enzyme